Alfa Romeo 900A is a bus produced by Alfa Romeo from 1952 to 1956.

Characteristics
The first model came with a length of 10.3 m. The bus had an Alfa Romeo 1606 engine with 130 HP and 2,000 revolutions per minute, with six cylinders.

Two longer versions were also produced.

Production
Alfa Romeo 900A by Carponi, 1952 to 1955 - 14 units
Alfa Romeo 900A by Macchi 1955 to 1956 - 29 units
Alfa Romeo 900 had a GranTurismo version by Macchi - 4 units.

Operators
The Alfa Romeo 900A was used by ATM in Milan, Italy.

See also
 List of buses

References

900A